"Control" is a song by the rock band Puddle of Mudd. It is the first single off of their album Come Clean. It was released in July 2001, was written by Wes Scantlin and was co-written by Brad Stewart. The song peaked at number three on both the Billboard Mainstream Rock and the Modern Rock Tracks chart and number 68 on the Billboard Hot 100.

Meaning and background
"Control" is about a relationship that Puddle of Mudd member Wes Scantlin was in. Scantlin told MTV that he was "going out with an uncontrollable person" and said that he was uncontrollable, too. Scantlin then told MTV:

Music video
The music video starts with a segment of Wes Scantlin being kicked out from a truck after he had been arguing with a girl who was driving. As a result, the band are late to a gig at a local bar. The majority of the video cuts between Scantlin walking to the venue, the driver driving away from him, and the band performing at the bar. Towards the bridge of the song, Scantlin finds the girl again, who has pulled over to the side of the road. The two pretend to make up, but as the two embrace, Scantlin pickpockets the woman of her keys. As the final chorus comes in, Scantlin throws her keys into a puddle of mud, a pun on the band's name.

Single

Track listings

US and Europe promo (2001)

Europe enhanced single (2001)

Australian enhanced (2001)

UK enhanced single (2002)

UK 7-inch brown vinyl

Europe enhanced maxi single (2002)

Charts

References

External links

2001 singles
Puddle of Mudd songs
2001 songs
Geffen Records singles
Songs written by Wes Scantlin
Songs written by Brad Stewart
Nu metal songs